Puerto Rico Highway 52 (PR-52), a major toll road in Puerto Rico, is also known as Autopista Luis A. Ferré. It was formerly called Expreso Las Américas. It runs from PR-1 in southwest Río Piedras and heads south until it intersects with highway PR-2 in Ponce. At its north end, the short PR-18 continues north from PR-52 towards San Juan. This short segment is known as Expreso Las Americas, the only segment of the route still unofficially bearing this name, since PR-18 is officially named Roberto Sánchez Vilella Expressway.  The combined route of PR-18 and PR-52 runs concurrent with the unsigned Interstate Highway PRI-1. Toll stations are located in San Juan, Caguas, Salinas, Juana Díaz, and Ponce.

Route description

PR-52 is Puerto Rico's longest and second most traveled tollway. The road is mostly a 2-lane road in each direction. The section between the Caguas toll and the town of Salinas crosses the Cordillera Central, resulting in a more curvy and hilly section than the other sections of the highway. It also experiences more fog and lower visibility than the rest of the road due to the altitude. The speed limit is also reduced in the area.

One of Puerto Rico's only 2 rest areas is located on this expressway. map The other rest area is located on PR-53 (northbound only) near Humacao/Naguabo municipality border although it is signed as a scenic zone and thus just like the rest area on PR-52, it has no facilities. map The rest area, however, has no relief, vending, or service facilities such as a restaurant or a gas station. The rest area does include an important monument, the Monumento al Jíbaro Puertorriqueño. The whimsical Tetas de Cayey are visible from this rest area as well.

PR-52 passes extremely close to the central town of Cidra between approximately kilometer markers 34 and 30. In fact, Exit 32 to Guavate is so close to the Cidra border that once the exit is taken and instead of going south to Guavate and Patillas through PR-184, going north it quickly ends at PR-1 and a welcome sign to Cidra is shown. The tollway itself never enters Cidra itself, but PR-1 (the parallel road from Ponce to San Juan) does.

History
The building of this  expressway took place during the administration of governor Luis A. Ferré, who was trained as a civil engineer himself.
 It was built at a cost of $125 million.  PR-52 was Puerto Rico's first toll road ever. Construction for this road started in October 1968 during the administration of governor Roberto Sánchez Vilella, also a trained engineer, and continued during Luis Ferre's tenure. It was then named Autopista Las Americas, and it was planned to run from San Juan to Ponce.  On 9 December 1993, Law 118 was enacted which renamed the roadway Autopista Luis A. Ferre.  The expressway is currently the longest in the island, but this will change when the 83-km-long PR-22 extends to Aguadilla. In March 1969 the roadway became a tolled expressway. The Puerto Rico Highway and Transportation Authority reports that tolls were added to the highway to speed up its construction. The road was completed in 1975 during the first administration of governor Rafael Hernández Colón.

On 22 July 2019, more than half a million Puerto Ricans shut down PR-52 demanding the resignation of the then governor, Ricardo Rosselló, following a leaked Telegram chat between the governor and several members of his cabinet.

Tolls

Exit list

See also

 Interstate Highways in Puerto Rico
 List of highways in Ponce, Puerto Rico
 List of highways numbered 52

References

External links

 

052
52
52
Tolled sections of Interstate Highways